Somewhere Inside is the debut studio album by Canadian country music artist Chris Cummings. It was released by Warner Music Canada on June 18, 1996. The album peaked at number 21 on the RPM Country Albums chart and was certified Gold by Music Canada in 1998.

An alternate version of the album, titled Chris Cummings, was released in the United States by Warner Bros. Nashville on February 24, 1998. This version replaces three songs on the original album with "'Til I See You Again", "The Kind of Heart That Breaks", and "A Minute and a Half".

Track listing

Chart performance

References

1996 debut albums
Chris Cummings albums
Albums produced by Jim Ed Norman
Warner Records albums